Austroliotia darwinensis is a species of sea snail, a marine gastropod mollusk in the family Liotiidae.

Description

Distribution
This marine species occurs off Darwin, Northern Territory, Australia, at depths between 39 m and 190 m.

References

 Laseron, C. 1958. Liotiidae and allied molluscs from the Dampierian Zoogeographical Province. Records of the Australian Museum 24(11): 165–182, figs 1–87 
 Jenkins, B.W. (1984). Northern Australian Liotiidae. Australian Shell News. 48 : 8–9

External links
  Australian Faunal Directory: Austroliotia darwinensis

darwinensis
Gastropods described in 1958